The 2014 Family Circle Cup was a women's tennis event on the 2014 WTA Tour. It took place from March 31 to April 6, 2014. It was the 42nd edition of the tournament and a Premier level tournament. The event was hosted at the Family Circle Tennis Center, on Daniel Island, Charleston, United States. It is the only event of the clay court season played on green clay.

Points and prize money

Point distribution

Prize money 
The total commitment prize money for this year's event was $710,000

Singles main draw entrants

Seeds 

1 Rankings as of March 17, 2014

Other entrants 
The following players received wildcards into the main draw:
  Melanie Oudin
  Nadia Petrova
  Shelby Rogers

The following player received entry using a protected ranking into the main draw:
  Petra Cetkovská

The following players received entry from the qualifying draw:
  Belinda Bencic
  Kiki Bertens
  Jarmila Gajdošová
  Alla Kudryavtseva
  Michelle Larcher de Brito
  Grace Min
  Lesia Tsurenko
  Zheng Saisai

Withdrawals 
Before the tournament
  Alizé Cornet → replaced by  Caroline Garcia
  Casey Dellacqua → replaced by  Dinah Pfizenmaier
  Polona Hercog → replaced by  Virginie Razzano
  Svetlana Kuznetsova → replaced by  Anabel Medina Garrigues
  Bethanie Mattek-Sands (hip injury) → replaced by  Mirjana Lučić-Baroni
  Anastasia Pavlyuchenkova → replaced by  Julia Glushko
  Galina Voskoboeva → replaced by  Julia Görges

Retirements 
  Kiki Bertens (lower back injury)

Doubles main draw entrants

Seeds 

1 Rankings as of March 17, 2014

Other entrants 
The following pairs received wildcards into the doubles main draw:
  Eugenie Bouchard /  Taylor Townsend
  Sorana Cîrstea /  Maria Kirilenko
  Jelena Janković /  Andrea Petkovic

The following pair received entry as alternates:
  Jarmila Gajdošová /  Zheng Saisai

Withdrawals 
Before the tournament
  Barbora Záhlavová-Strýcová (left wrist injury)

Retirements 
  Peng Shuai (abdominal strain)
  Anastasia Rodionova (concussion)

Champions

Singles 

  Andrea Petkovic defeated  Jana Čepelová 7–5, 6–2

Doubles 

  Anabel Medina Garrigues /  Yaroslava Shvedova defeated  Chan Hao-ching /  Chan Yung-jan 7–6(7–4), 6–2

References

External links 
 

2014 WTA Tour
Family Circle Cup
Family Circle Cup
Family Circle Cup
Family Circle Cup
Charleston Open